Thromboplastin (TPL) is derived from cell membranes and is a mixture of both phospholipids and tissue factor, neither of which are enzymes.  Thromboplastin acts on and accelerates the activity of Factor Xa, also known as thrombokinase, aiding blood coagulation through catalyzing the conversion of prothrombin to thrombin. Thromboplastin is found in brain, lung, and other tissues and especially in blood platelets.

Although sometimes used as a synonym for the protein tissue factor (with its official name "Coagulation factor III [thromboplastin, tissue factor]"), this is a misconception. Historically, thromboplastin was a lab reagent, usually derived from placental sources, used to assay prothrombin times (PT).

When manipulated in the laboratory, a derivative could be created called partial thromboplastin. Partial thromboplastin was used to measure the intrinsic pathway. This test is called the aPTT, or activated partial thromboplastin time.  It was not until much later that the subcomponents of thromboplastin and partial thromboplastin were identified. Thromboplastin is the combination of both phospholipids and tissue factor, both of which are needed in the activation of the extrinsic pathway. However, partial thromboplastin is just phospholipids, and not tissue factor. Therefore, the coagulation cascade is triggered only through the intrinsic pathway. This enables researchers to isolate this part of the coagulation cascade for measurements and evaluation of functionality.

Currently, recombinant tissue factor is available and used in some PT assays. Placental derivatives are still available and are used in some laboratories.  Phospholipid is available as an independent reagent or in combination with tissue factor as thromboplastin. Complete thromboplastin consists of tissue factor, phospholipids (since platelets were removed from blood sample being tested), and CaCl2 to reintroduce calcium ions which were chelated by sodium citrate originally used to prevent coagulation of the sample blood during transportation and/or storage.

See also
 Tissue factor

References

Further reading 

 Kottke-Marchant, Kandice; "An Algorithmic Approach to Hemostasis Testing"; CAP Press; Northfield, Il; Copyright 2008. .

External links 
 

Coagulation system
Human proteins